The Guards Reserve Corps was a corps level command of the German Army in World War I.

Formation 
Guards Reserve Corps was formed on the outbreak of the war in August 1914 as part of the mobilisation of the Prussian Army. It was initially commanded by  Max von Gallwitz, formerly Inspector General of Artillery.

Temporary Corps Marschall was formed on 7 July 1915 and renamed Guards Reserve Corps on 18 April 1916.  It was still in existence at the end of the war in the 4th Army, part of  Rupprecht on the Western Front.

Structure on formation 
On formation in August 1914, Guards Reserve Corps consisted of two divisions.  In general, reserve corps and reserve divisions were weaker than their active counterparts, but the Guards Reserve Corps was exceptional in that
the 3rd Guards Division, although new, consisted almost entirely of regular army units
the 1st Guards Reserve Division had a field artillery brigade of two regiments (most reserve divisions only had one regiment)
the corps troops were equivalent to an active corps, lacking only an aviation detachment

The Guards Reserve Corps mobilised with 26 infantry battalions, 9 machine gun companies (54 machine guns), 6 cavalry squadrons, 24 field artillery batteries (144 guns), 4 heavy batteries (16 guns) and 3 pioneer companies.

Combat chronicle 
On mobilisation, Guards Reserve Corps was assigned to the 2nd Army as part of the right wing of the forces that invaded France and Belgium as part of the Schlieffen Plan offensive in August 1914.  It participated in the capture of Namur and was immediately transferred to the Eastern Front to join the 8th Army in time to participate in the First Battle of the Masurian Lakes.

On 9 February 1915, the Corps headquarters was upgraded to form the headquarters of  Gallwitz (later the 12th Army).

Temporary Corps Marschall was formed on 7 July 1915 and established as the Guards Reserve Corps on 18 April 1916.  It was still in existence at the end of the war in the 4th Army,  Rupprecht on the Western Front.

Commanders 
Guards Reserve Corps had the following commanders during its existence:

Glossary 
 Armee-Abteilung or Army Detachment in the sense of "something detached from an Army".  It is not under the command of an Army so is in itself a small Army.
 Armee-Gruppe or Army Group in the sense of a group within an Army and under its command, generally formed as a temporary measure for a specific task.
 Heeresgruppe or Army Group in the sense of a number of armies under a single commander.

See also 

 German Army order of battle (1914)
 German Army order of battle, Western Front (1918)

References

Bibliography 
 
 
 
 
 

Corps of Germany in World War I
Military units and formations established in 1914
Military units and formations disestablished in 1915
Military units and formations established in 1915
Military units and formations disestablished in 1918